Sally Caves is the pen name of Sarah Higley, a science fiction writer and professor of English at the University of Rochester. She is best known for creating the Star Trek character Reginald Barclay.

Star Trek
Caves wrote the Star Trek: The Next Generation episode "Hollow Pursuits", in which Reginald Barclay was introduced. She also co-authored the story of the Star Trek: Deep Space Nine episode "Babel".

Teonaht

Caves is the creator of Teonaht, a notable constructed language.

Bibliography 

 Hildegard of Bingen's Unknown Language.  Palgrave Macmillan, 2007.
 "Fetch Felix".  The Magazine of Fantasy and Science Fiction, July 1991
 Ketamine, F&SF, March 1995

References

External links
Teonaht home page
Sarah Higley at the University of Rochester

20th-century American short story writers
American science fiction writers
American women short story writers
Constructed language creators
Year of birth missing (living people)
Living people
University of Rochester faculty
American academics of English literature
Women science fiction and fantasy writers
Place of birth missing (living people)
Writers from New York (state)
American women non-fiction writers
20th-century American women writers
American women academics
21st-century American women